The Most Ancient and Most Noble Order of the Thistle is an order of chivalry associated with Scotland. The current version of the Order was founded in 1687 by King James VII of Scotland, who asserted that he was reviving an earlier Order. The Order consists of the Sovereign and sixteen Knights and Ladies, as well as certain "extra" knights (members of the British Royal Family and foreign monarchs). The Sovereign alone grants membership of the Order; they are not advised by the Government, as occurs with most other Orders.

The Order's primary emblem is the thistle, the national flower of Scotland. The motto is Nemo me impune lacessit (Latin for "No one provokes me with impunity"). The same motto appears on the royal coat of arms of the United Kingdom for use in Scotland and pound coins minted in 1984, 1989, 1994, and 1999 (since withdrawn), and is also the motto of the Royal Scots Dragoon Guards, the Scots Guards, the Royal Regiment of Scotland, and The Black Watch (Royal Highland Regiment) of Canada. The patron saint of the Order is St Andrew.

Most British orders of chivalry cover the whole United Kingdom, but the three most exalted ones each pertain to one constituent country only. The Order of the Thistle, which pertains to Scotland, is the second most senior in precedence. Its equivalent in England, the Most Noble Order of the Garter, is the oldest documented order of chivalry in the United Kingdom, dating to the middle fourteenth century. In 1783 an Irish equivalent, the Most Illustrious Order of St Patrick, was founded, but it is now dormant.

History 

The claim that James VII was reviving an earlier Order is generally not supported by the evidence. The 1687 warrant states that during a battle in 786 with Angles under Aethelstan, the cross of St Andrew appeared in the sky to Achaius, King of Scots; after his victory, he established the Order of the Thistle and dedicated it to the saint. This seems unlikely on the face of it, since Achaius died a century before Aethelstan of East Anglia (though it is now thought that the opponents in this battle were not the East Anglian king Aethelstan (born around 894) but an earlier Northumbrian of the same name, and not the legendary Scottish King Achaius but the historical Pictish King Óengus II).

An alternative version is that the Order was founded in 809 to commemorate an alliance between Achaius and Emperor Charlemagne; there is some plausibility to this, insofar as Charlemagne is believed to have employed Scottish bodyguards. Yet another version is that Robert the Bruce instituted the order after his victory at Bannockburn in 1314.

Most historians consider the earliest credible claim to be the founding of the Order by James III, during the fifteenth century. He adopted the thistle as the royal badge, issued coins depicting thistles and allegedly conferred membership of the "Order of the Burr or Thissil" on Francis I of France, although there is no conclusive evidence for this.

 
Some Scottish order of chivalry may have existed during the sixteenth century, possibly founded by James V and called the Order of St. Andrew, but lapsed by the end of that century, although the evidence is unclear. A Royal thistle collar is depicted in a book of hours, prepared for James IV in about 1503, where he is shown kneeling at an altar bearing the Royal Arms encircled by a collar of thistles and a badge depicting St Andrew. In a painting of 1538, James V is shown wearing a gold collar of linked thistles with a St Andrew badge, although the King's wardrobe inventories of the period make no mention of a thistle collar.

In 1558, a French commentator described the use of the crowned thistle and St Andrew's cross on Scottish coins and banners but noted there was no Scottish order of knighthood. Writing around 1578, John Lesley refers to the three foreign orders of chivalry carved on the gate of Linlithgow Palace, with James V's ornaments of St Andrew, proper to this nation. In 1610 William Fowler, the Scottish secretary to Anne of Denmark was asked about the Order of the Thistle. Fowler believed that there had been an Order, founded to honour Scots who fought for Charles VII of France, but it had been discontinued in the time of James V, and could say nothing of its ceremonies or regalia.

James VII issued letters patent "reviving and restoring the Order of the Thistle to its full glory, lustre and magnificency" on 29 May 1687. His intention was to reward Scottish Catholics for their loyalty, but the initiative actually came from John, 1st Earl and 1st Jacobite Duke of Melfort, then Secretary of State for Scotland. Only eight members out of a possible twelve were appointed; these included Catholics, such as Melfort and the Lord Chancellor of Scotland, his elder brother James, 4th Earl and 1st Jacobite Duke of Perth, plus Protestant supporters like the Earl of Arran.
   
After James was deposed by the 1688 Glorious Revolution no further appointments were made, although the exiled House of Stuart continued to issue a Jacobite version, not recognised by the British Crown. Queen Anne appointed knights to the Order from 1704, and it has remained in existence since then, and is used to recognise Scots 'who have held public office or contributed significantly to national life.'

Founder knights: 1687 creation
James, Earl of Perth; went into exile with James in 1688, died in France 1716
George, Duke of Gordon; exiled in 1689 but returned home and pardoned, included in the 1703 revival by Anne, died 1716
John, Marquis of Atholl; reconciled with new regime in 1689, died 1703
James, Earl of Arran; confirmed in his titles by William III in 1698, heavily involved in the disastrous Darien Scheme, abstained from the vote passing the 1707 Acts of Union, killed in a duel with Lord Mohun, 1712
Kenneth, Earl of Seaforth; imprisoned after 1688, released in 1696 and moved to Paris, died 1701
John, Earl of Melfort; went into exile with James in 1688, died in France 1714
George, Earl of Dumbarton; went into exile with James in 1688, died in France 1692
Alexander, Earl of Moray; lost office after 1688, died at home 1701

Composition 

The Kings of Scots, later the Kings of Great Britain and of the United Kingdom, have served as Sovereigns of the Order. When James VII revived the Order, the statutes stated that the Order would continue the ancient number of Knights, which was described in the preceding warrant as "the Sovereign and twelve Knights-Brethren in allusion to the Blessed Saviour and his Twelve Apostles". In 1827, George IV increased the number to sixteen members. Women (other than Queens regnant) were originally excluded from the Order; George VI created his wife Queen Elizabeth a Lady of the Thistle in 1937 by a special statute, and in 1987 Elizabeth II allowed the regular admission of women to both the Order of the Thistle and the Order of the Garter.

From time to time, individuals may be admitted to the Order by special statutes. Such members are known as "Extra Knights" and do not count towards the sixteen-member limit. Members of the British Royal Family are normally admitted through this procedure; the first to be so admitted was Prince Albert. King Olav V of Norway, the first foreigner to be admitted to the Order, was also admitted by special statute in 1962.

The Sovereign has historically had the power to choose Knights of the Order. From the eighteenth century onwards, the Sovereign made his or her choices upon the advice of the Government. George VI felt that the Orders of the Garter and the Thistle had been used only for political patronage, rather than to reward actual merit. Therefore, with the agreement of the Prime Minister (Clement Attlee) and the Leader of the Opposition (Winston Churchill) in 1946, both Orders returned to the personal gift of the Sovereign.

Knights and Ladies of the Thistle may also be admitted to the Order of the Garter. Formerly, many, but not all, Knights elevated to the senior Order would resign from the Order of the Thistle. The first to resign from the Order of the Thistle was John, Duke of Argyll in 1710; the last to take such an action was Thomas, Earl of Zetland in 1872. 

Knights and Ladies of the Thistle may also be deprived of their knighthoods. The only individual to have suffered such a fate was John Erskine, 6th Earl of Mar who lost both the knighthood and the earldom after participating in the Jacobite rising of 1715.

The Order has five officers: the Chancellor, the Secretary, the Dean, Lyon King of Arms, and the Usher. The Dean is normally a cleric of the Church of Scotland. This office was not part of the original establishment, but was created in 1763 and joined to the office of Dean of the Chapel Royal. The two offices were separated in 1969. The office of Chancellor is mentioned and given custody of the seal of the Order in the 1687 statutes, but no-one was appointed to the position until 1913. The office has subsequently been held by one of the knights, though not necessarily the most senior. The Usher of the Order is the Gentleman Usher of the Green Rod (unlike his Garter equivalent, the Gentleman Usher of the Black Rod, he does not have another function assisting the House of Lords). The Lord Lyon King of Arms, head of the Scottish heraldic establishment, whose office predates his association with the Order, serves as King of Arms of the Order.

Symbolism 

According to legend, an invading Norse army was attempting to sneak up at night upon a Scottish army's encampment. During this operation, one barefoot Norseman had the misfortune to step upon a thistle, causing him to cry out in pain, thus alerting Scots to the presence of the Norse invaders. Some sources suggest the specific occasion was the 1263 Battle of Largs, which marked the beginning of the departure of King Haakon IV (Haakon the Elder) of Norway who, having control of the Northern Isles and Hebrides, had harried the coast of the Kingdom of Scotland for some years.

Habit and insignia 

For the Order's great occasions, such as its annual service each June or July, as well for coronations, the Knights and Ladies wear an elaborate costume:
 The mantle is a green robe worn over their suits or military uniforms. The mantle is lined with white taffeta; it is tied with green and gold tassels. On the left shoulder of the mantle, the star of the Order (see below) is depicted.
 The hat is made of black velvet and is plumed with white feathers with a black egret's or heron's top in the middle.
 The collar is made of gold and depicts thistles and sprigs of rue. It is worn over the mantle.
 The St Andrew, also called the badge-appendant, is worn suspended from the collar. It comprises a gold enamelled depiction of St Andrew, wearing a green gown and purple coat, holding a white saltire. Gold rays of a glory are shown emanating from St Andrew's head.

Aside from these special occasions, however, much simpler insignia are used whenever a member of the Order attends an event at which decorations are worn:
 The star of the Order consists of a silver St Andrew's saltire, with clusters of rays between the arms thereof. In the centre is depicted a green circle bearing the motto of the Order in gold majuscules; within the circle, there is depicted a thistle on a gold field. It is worn pinned to the left breast. (Since the Order of the Thistle is the second most senior chivalric order in the UK, a member will wear its star above that of other orders to which he or she belongs, except that of the Order of the Garter; up to four orders' stars may be worn.)
 The broad riband is a dark green sash worn across the body, from the left shoulder to the right hip.
 At the right hip of the Riband, the badge of the Order is attached. The badge depicts St Andrew in the same form as the badge-appendant, surrounded by the Order's motto.

However, on certain collar days designated by the Sovereign, members attending formal events may wear the Order's collar over their military uniform, formal wear, or other costume. They will then substitute the broad riband of another order to which they belong (if any), since the Order of the Thistle is represented by the collar.

Upon the death of a Knight or Lady, the insignia must be returned to the Central Chancery of the Orders of Knighthood. The badge and star are returned personally to the Sovereign by the nearest relative of the deceased.

Officers of the Order also wear green robes. The Gentleman Usher of the Green Rod also bears, as the title suggests, a green rod.

Chapel 

When James VII created the modern Order in 1687, he directed that the Abbey Church at the Palace of Holyroodhouse be converted to a Chapel for the Order of the Thistle, perhaps copying the idea from the Order of the Garter (whose chapel is located in Windsor Castle). James VII, however, was deposed by 1688; the Chapel, meanwhile, had been destroyed during riots. The Order did not have a Chapel until 1911, when one was added onto St Giles High Kirk in Edinburgh. Each year, the Sovereign resides at the Palace of Holyroodhouse for a week in June or July; during the visit, a service for the Order is held. Any new Knights or Ladies are installed at annual services.

Each member of the Order, including the Sovereign, is allotted a stall in the Chapel, above which his or her heraldic devices are displayed. Perched on the pinnacle of a knight's stall is his helm, decorated with mantling and topped by his crest. If he is a peer, the coronet appropriate to his rank is placed beneath the helm. Under the laws of heraldry, women, other than monarchs, do not normally bear helms or crests; instead, the coronet alone is used (if she is a peeress or princess). Lady Marion Fraser had a helm and crest included when she was granted arms; these are displayed above her stall in the same manner as for knights. Unlike other British Orders, the armorial banners of Knights and Ladies of the Thistle are not hung in the chapel, but instead in an adjacent part of St Giles High Kirk. The Thistle Chapel does, however, bear the arms of members living and deceased on stall plates. These enamelled plates are affixed to the back of the stall and display its occupant's name, arms, and date of admission into the Order.

Upon the death of a Knight, helm, mantling, crest (or coronet or crown) and sword are taken down. The stall plates, however, are not removed; rather, they remain permanently affixed to the back of the stall, so that the stalls of the chapel are festooned with a colourful record of the Order's Knights and Ladies since 1911. The entryway just outside the doors of the chapel has the names of the Order's Knights from before 1911 inscribed into the walls giving a complete record of the members of the order.

Precedence and privileges 

Knights and Ladies of the Thistle are assigned positions in the order of precedence, ranking above all others of knightly rank except the Order of the Garter, and above baronets. Wives, sons, daughters and daughters-in-law of Knights of the Thistle also feature on the order of precedence; relatives of Ladies of the Thistle, however, are not assigned any special precedence. (Generally, individuals can derive precedence from their fathers or husbands, but not from their mothers or wives.)

Knights of the Thistle prefix "Sir", and Ladies prefix "Lady", to their forenames. Wives of Knights may prefix "Lady" to their surnames, but no equivalent privilege exists for husbands of Ladies. Such forms are not used by peers and princes, except when the names of the former are written out in their fullest forms.

Knights and Ladies use the post-nominal letters "KT" and "LT" respectively. When an individual is entitled to use multiple post-nominal letters, "KT" or "LT" appears before all others, except "Bt" or "Btss" (Baronet or Baronetess), "VC" (Victoria Cross), "GC" (George Cross) and "KG" or "LG" (Knight or Lady of the Garter).

Knights and Ladies may encircle their arms with the circlet (a green circle bearing the Order's motto) and the collar of the Order; the former is shown either outside or on top of the latter. The badge is depicted suspended from the collar. The Royal Arms depict the collar and motto of the Order of the Thistle only in Scotland; they show the circlet and motto of the Garter in England, Wales and Northern Ireland.

Knights and Ladies are also entitled to receive heraldic supporters. This high privilege is shared only by members of the Royal Family, peers, Knights and Ladies of the Garter, and Knights and Dames Grand Cross of the junior orders of chivalry and clan chiefs.

Current members and officers 
 Sovereign: The King
 Knights and Ladies:
 The Earl of Elgin and Kincardine  (1981)
 The Earl of Airlie  (1985)
 The Lord Mackay of Clashfern  (1997)
 The Lord Wilson of Tillyorn  (2000)
 The Lord Steel of Aikwood  (2004)
 The Lord Robertson of Port Ellen  (2004)
 The Lord Cullen of Whitekirk  (2007)
 The Lord Hope of Craighead  (2009)
 The Lord Patel  (2009)
 The Lord Smith of Kelvin  (2014)
 The Duke of Buccleuch and Queensberry  (2017)
 Sir Ian Wood  (2018)
 Lady Elish Angiolini  (2022)
 Sir George Reid  (2022)
Vacant
Vacant
 Extra Knights and Ladies:
 Anne, Princess Royal  (2000)
 Prince William, Duke of Rothesay  (2012)
 Officers:
 Chancellor: The Earl of Airlie  
 Dean: The Reverend David Fergusson, 
 Secretary of the Thistle:  Elizabeth Roads 
 Lyon King of Arms: Joseph Morrow,  (Lord Lyon King of Arms)
 Gentleman Usher of the Green Rod: Rear Admiral Christopher Hope Layman

See also 
 List of Knights and Ladies of the Thistle (1687–present)
 Thistle Chapel

Notes

References

References

Printed

Online

 
 
 

 
1687 establishments in Scotland
Organizations established in 1687
Scottish awards
James II of England